Torud Rural District is a rural district (dehestan) in the Central District of Shahrud County, Semnan Province, Iran. At the 2006 census, its population was 3,542, in 782 families.  The rural district has 20 villages.

References 

Rural Districts of Semnan Province
Shahrud County